The Queen's Secretary (German: Der Sekretär der Königin) is a 1916 German silent comedy film directed by Robert Wiene and starring Käthe Dorsch, Ressel Orla and Margarete Kupfer. A young Queen secretly marries the commander of her bodyguard, but things are complicated when his ex-lover arrives with a touring opera company. The film was widely praised for its direction, acting and cinematography.

Cast
 Käthe Dorsch   
 Ressel Orla   
 Margarete Kupfer   
 Alexander Antalffy   
 Guido Herzfeld   
 Heinrich Schroth

References

Bibliography
 Jung, Uli & Schatzberg, Walter. Beyond Caligari: The Films of Robert Wiene. Berghahn Books, 1999.

External links

1916 films
Films of the German Empire
German silent feature films
German comedy films
Films directed by Robert Wiene
German black-and-white films
Films set in Europe
1916 comedy films
Silent comedy films
1910s German films